Ashley William Joseph (born 3 October 1965) is the founder and Director of the William Joseph International Academy for Performing Arts, Chairman of the William Joseph Music Foundation, Director and Conductor of the Bangalore Musical Association, Founder Director and Conductor of the Indian National Symphony Orchestra.

Early life
Ashley William Joseph was born on 3 October 1965 in Bangalore, Karnataka to a musically inclined couple, Maestro Joseph Thomas Williams and Mrs. Sarah William Joseph. Maestro J.T. Williams was the Chief Pipe Organist at St. Andrew's Church, Cubbon Road, Bangalore, Head of the Music Department at Baldwin Boys High School, Bangalore and on the board for performing arts at various old schools in Bangalore until his sudden demise in 1995. Maestro J.T. Williams died of a heart attack playing the pipe organ at St. Andrew's Church during a service. 

Growing up as the son of a musician, Joseph naturally had an inclination towards music at a young age. Growing up in the Old Bangalore gave him great exposure to performing arts which included music, art, and theatre. Dr. Ashley attended the Baldwin Boys High School, Bangalore where Maestro J.T.Williams was also the Head of the Music Department.

Education and training
While his early learning in music and inspiration came from his father, Maestro J. T William Joseph, Dr. Williams was selected in 1985 under scholarship to pursue his professional studies of music in Manila, Philippines, where he specialized in conducting, voice, piano, guitar, organ, and ethnomusicology. He has done extensive research into the history, origin, and performance of the sitar. He also had the opportunity to perform with the Philippine Philharmonic Orchestra, the Philippine Madrigal Singers, and the Asian Chorale. He has been honored with a Doctorate in Music by Trinity Open University.

Achievements

Joseph was the only Indian to perform with the Asian Chorale during their tour of Sweden where they performed for the King and Queen. He has also performed as a soloist in the United Kingdom with the Liverpool Male Voice Ensemble. He rewrote the western music notation into Indian music notation to enable and encourage Indian musicians to be a part of the Global YouTube Symphony Orchestra.

He has been honored by various institutions and organizations inside and outside the country. In 2012 he was invited to be on the board of the Trinity School of Music, which he declined due to prior commitments with the Indian National Symphony Orchestra. He is on the Board of Directors and is a member of the selection committee for various music institutions both in India and abroad.

In India, he is Director and Conductor of the Bangalore Musical Association, producing yearly classical concerts of serious Choral music. He is also Director and Conductor of the Indian National Symphony Orchestra.

Awards
He was honored by the then Chief Minister of Karnataka, B. S. Yeddyurappa on 27 December 2008 for outstanding contributions to the state, in the field of music and music education. His composition won first prize on All India Radio.

The YMCA of Singapore and the International Y's Men's Club of Singapore through a joint project in aid of the Thailand flood victims honored Dr. Ashley Williams for his performance with the Thailand Sanctuary Symphony Orchestra as Guest Conductor.

Joseph also received the Messenger of Peace Award from the International Cultural Development and Exchange group and the ICYE Germany. The decision to confer this award was taken at a conference in Geneva to honor the Global Peace and Harmony Concerts. He received a special citation for his contribution and performance in Singapore with the Thailand Sanctuary Symphony Orchestra to raise funds for the Thailand flood victims. He was honored for his performance in Malaysia (Ipoh) at a charity concert to raise funds for street children.

Notable students 
Actress Deepika Padukone was trained by Joseph. He would often tell Deepika Padukone's father, Prakash Padukone, that "all she wants to do is sing, act and dance". 2010 Miss Earth Nicole Faria was also a student of Dr. Williams.

Works
Over the years Joseph has directed and produced many Broadway musicals, including My Fair Lady, Man of La Mancha, Oliver Twist, Sound of Music, Fiddler on the Roof, Jungle Book, Annie, Sleeping Beauty, Cinderella, and Snow White.

He was invited to conduct the Hope of Bangkok Philharmonic Orchestra and the TSSO for charity concerts across Asia.

He has written and composed the Karnataka Traffic Warden's March.

Joseph has also been mentored at the Notre Dame Teachers Training College. 

He e-arranged ancient Kannada ethnic songs into a modern form for the young listener. He composed and directed the theme song for the ladies of the international Inner Wheel Club.

References

 http://www.williamjoseph.org/director.html
 http://www.thehindu.com/todays-paper/tp-features/tp-metroplus/dr-ashley-william-joseph/article5183261.ece
 http://www.indiastudychannel.com/training/11781-William-Joseph-International-Academy-for-Performing-Arts.aspx
 http://www.mybangalore.com/article/0809/classics-to-broadway-william-joseph-music-academy.html
 http://www.internationalinnerwheel.org/

1965 births
Living people
Musicians from Bangalore
Indian pianists
Indian conductors (music)
20th-century conductors (music)
20th-century Indian musicians
21st-century conductors (music)
21st-century pianists